Patulibacter medicamentivorans  is a Gram-positive, ibuprofen-degrading, non-spore-forming, rod-shaped, aerobic and non-motile bacterium from the genus of Patulibacter which has been isolated from activated sludge in Lisbon in Portugal.

References

 

Actinomycetota
Bacteria described in 2013